David Gallagher (born 1985) is an American film and television actor.

David Gallagher may also refer to:

David Gallagher (ambassador) (born 1944)
David Gallagher (Australian footballer) (born 1980), former Australian rules footballer
David Gallagher (Gaelic footballer) (born 1980), Meath Gaelic footballer
Dave Gallagher (born 1960), baseball player
Dave Gallagher (American football) (born 1952), former American football defensive tackle

See also
Dave Gallaher (1873–1917), New Zealand rugby union footballer
David Gallaher (born 1975), American comics writer and editor